In fluid dynamics, Luke's variational principle is a Lagrangian variational description of the motion of surface waves on a fluid with a free surface, under the action of gravity. This principle is named after J.C. Luke, who published it in 1967. This variational principle is for incompressible and inviscid potential flows, and is used to derive approximate wave models like the mild-slope equation, or using the averaged Lagrangian approach for wave propagation in inhomogeneous media.

Luke's Lagrangian formulation can also be recast into a Hamiltonian formulation in terms of the surface elevation and velocity potential at the free surface. This is often used when modelling the spectral density evolution of the free-surface in a sea state, sometimes called wave turbulence.

Both the Lagrangian and Hamiltonian formulations can be extended to include surface tension effects, and by using Clebsch potentials to include vorticity.

Luke's Lagrangian

Luke's Lagrangian formulation is for non-linear surface gravity waves on an—incompressible, irrotational and inviscid—potential flow.

The relevant ingredients, needed in order to describe this flow, are:
 is the velocity potential,
 is the fluid density,
 is the acceleration by the Earth's gravity,
 is the vertical coordinate,
 is time, and
 is the time-dependent fluid domain with free surface.

The Lagrangian , as given by Luke, is:

From Bernoulli's principle, this Lagrangian can be seen to be the integral of the fluid pressure over the whole time-dependent fluid domain . This is in agreement with the variational principles for inviscid flow without a free surface, found by Harry Bateman.

Variation with respect to the velocity potential  and free-moving surfaces like  results in the Laplace equation for the potential in the fluid interior and all required boundary conditions: kinematic boundary conditions on all fluid boundaries and dynamic boundary conditions on free surfaces. This may also include moving wavemaker walls and ship motion.

Below, Luke's variational principle is used to arrive at the flow equations for non-linear surface gravity waves on a potential flow.

Derivation of the flow equations resulting from Luke's variational principle

The variation  in the Lagrangian with respect to variations in the velocity potential Φ(x,z,t), as well as with respect to the surface elevation , have to be zero. We consider both variations subsequently.

Variation with respect to the velocity potential

Consider a small variation  in the velocity potential . Then the resulting variation in the Lagrangian is:

Using Leibniz integral rule, this becomes, in case of constant density :

For variations  which are zero at the free surface and the bed, the second integral remains, which is only zero for arbitrary  in the fluid interior if there the Laplace equation holds:

with  the Laplace operator.

If variations  are considered which are only non-zero at the free surface, only the third integral remains, giving rise to the kinematic free-surface boundary condition:

Similarly, variations  only non-zero at the bottom  result in the kinematic bed condition:

Variation with respect to the surface elevation

Considering the variation of the Lagrangian with respect to small changes  gives:

This has to be zero for arbitrary , giving rise to the dynamic boundary condition at the free surface:

This is the Bernoulli equation for unsteady potential flow, applied at the free surface, and with the pressure above the free surface being a constant — which constant pressure is taken equal to zero for simplicity.

Hamiltonian formulation

The Hamiltonian structure of surface gravity waves on a potential flow was discovered by Vladimir E. Zakharov in 1968, and rediscovered independently by Bert Broer and John Miles:

where the surface elevation  and surface potential  — which is the potential  at the free surface  — are the canonical variables. The Hamiltonian  is the sum of the kinetic and potential energy of the fluid:

The additional constraint is that the flow in the fluid domain has to satisfy Laplace's equation with appropriate boundary condition at the bottom  and that the potential at the free surface  is equal to :

Relation with Lagrangian formulation

The Hamiltonian formulation can be derived from Luke's Lagrangian description by using Leibniz integral rule on the integral of :

with  the value of the velocity potential at the free surface, and  the Hamiltonian density — sum of the kinetic and potential energy density — and related to the Hamiltonian as:

The Hamiltonian density is written in terms of the surface potential using Green's third identity on the kinetic energy:

Because of the linearity of the Laplace equation — valid in the fluid interior and depending on the boundary condition at the bed  and free surface  — the normal derivative  is a linear function of the surface potential , but depends non-linear on the surface elevation .

The Hamiltonian density can also be written as:

with  the vertical velocity at the free surface . Also  is a linear function of the surface potential  through the Laplace equation, but  depends non-linear on the surface elevation :

As a result, the Hamiltonian is a quadratic functional of the surface potential . Also the potential energy part of the Hamiltonian is quadratic. The source of non-linearity in surface gravity waves is through the kinetic energy depending non-linear on the free surface shape .

Further  is not to be mistaken for the horizontal velocity  at the free surface:

Taking the variations of the Lagrangian  with respect to the canonical variables  and  gives:

References and notes

Fluid dynamics